The Hongqi HS5 is a compact luxury crossover SUV produced by the Chinese luxury car manufacturer Hongqi from 2019.

Overview

The Hongqi HS5 was originally previewed as the “U-Concept” concept car that was unveiled during the 2017 Shanghai Auto Show. It was designed by Italdesign. 

The production version of the Hongqi HS5 is positioned as a luxury C-class SUV in the Chinese market. The price range is from 183,800 yuan to 249,800 yuan (US$27,506 – US$37,383).

The Hongqi HS5 is powered by a 2.0 liter turbocharged engine with a maximum power output of 165kW (221HP), mated to a 6-speed automatic transmission. The Hongqi HS5 will also meet the China-IV (CN-6B) emission standard.

References

HS5
Crossover sport utility vehicles
Compact sport utility vehicles
Luxury sport utility vehicles
All-wheel-drive vehicles
Cars introduced in 2019
2010s cars
2020s cars